Ripple railway station was a station on the Midland Railway between Great Malvern and Evesham.  It opened on 16 May 1864 by the Tewkesbury and Malvern Railway and was closed 14 August 1961.

References

Further reading

 

Disused railway stations in Worcestershire
Former Midland Railway stations
Railway stations in Great Britain opened in 1864
Railway stations in Great Britain closed in 1961